Events from the year 1918 in art.

Events
 February – British War Memorials Committee formed to commission artworks to create a memorial to the World War I, including a (never-built) Hall of Remembrance.
 February 16 – Joan Miró's first solo exhibition opens at the Galeries Dalmau; his work is ridiculed and defaced.
 March – C. R. W. Nevinson has an exhibition at the Leicester Galleries in London. His war painting Paths of Glory, condemned by the British Army censor for its depiction of dead soldiers, is displayed by the artist with a brown paper strip across the bodies bearing the word "Censored" and subsequently replaced in the exhibition by a painting of a tank.
 May – Stanley Spencer, a serving British Army soldier, is appointed as an official war artist. A similar appointment is made this year for Australian soldier Frank R. Crozier.
 May 3 – William Orpen's exhibition War opens in London; the paintings are donated to the British government. He is knighted in June.
 May 11  – Paul Nash's exhibition The Void of War opens at the Leicester Galleries in London.
 June 18 – Pablo Picasso marries Olga Khoklova.
 June – Alfred Stieglitz begins nude photography of Georgia O'Keeffe.
 October 15 – Kunsthalle Bern opened.
 November 3 – The Robespierre Monument (Moscow), designed by Beatrice Yuryevna Sandomierz, is unveiled; it collapses four days later.
 November 7–December 14 – British painter Colin Gill, having previously served as a soldier on the Western Front, returns to France to work for the British War Memorials Committee.
 December 3 – The November Group (Novembergruppe) of expressionist artists is formed in Germany, and shortly afterwards merges with the Arbeitsrat für Kunst.
 Denver Art Museum in Colorado opens its first galleries.
 Frans Masereel's wordless novel 25 Images of a Man's Passion is published.

Works

 Anna Airy
 An Aircraft Assembly Shop, Hendon
 The 'L' Press: Forging the Jacket of an 18-inch Gun, Armstrong-Whitworth Works, Openshaw
 A Shell Forge at a National Projectile Factory, Hackney Marshes, London
 Shop for Machining 15-inch Shells: Singer Manufacturing Company, Clydebank, Glasgow
 Women Working in a Gas Retort House: South Metropolitan Gas Company, London
 George Bellows
 The Barricade
 Edith Cavell
 Victor David Brenner – Mary Schenley Memorial Fountain (Philadelphia)
 Charles Buchel – Radclyffe Hall
 George Clausen – In the Gun Factory at Woolwich Arsenal
 Charles Demuth – Turkish Bath with self-portrait
 Katherine Sophie Dreier – Abstract Portrait of Marcel Duchamp
 Eric Enstrom – Grace (photograph)
 Charles Buckles Falls – Books Wanted (poster)
 Roger Fry
 Nina Hamnett
 Self-portrait
 Georges Gardet – Eternal Youth (gilded sculpture on Manitoba Legislative Building)
 Mark Gertler – The Pool at Garsington
 J. W. Godward
 A Fond Farewell
 Sweet Sounds
 Duncan Grant – The White Jug (finished version)
 George Grosz – The Funeral
 Eric Kennington – Gassed and Wounded
 Ernst Ludwig Kirchner – Self-portrait as a Patient
 Paul Klee
 Flower Myth
 Warning of the Ships
 Boris Kustodiev
 The Merchant's Wife
 Sten'ka Razin
 Fernand Léger
 Bargeman
 In the Factory
 Wyndham Lewis – A Canadian Gun-Pit
 Flora Lion – Women's Canteen at Phoenix Works, Bradford
 John Hodgson Lobley
 Outside Charing Cross Station, July 1916. Casualties from the Battle of the Somme arriving in London
 The Queen's Hospital for Facial Injuries, Frognal, Sidcup: The Toy-Makers' Shop
 José Malhoa – Autumn
 Ivan Meštrović – Dr. Elsie Inglis (bronze bust)
 Amedeo Modigliani – Portrait of Blaise Cendrars
 Alfred Munnings
 Draft Horses, Lumber Mill in the Forest of Dreux
 Warrior
 Kaita Murayama – Self-portrait
 John Nash
 The Cornfield
 Oppy Wood, 1917, Evening
 Over The Top
 Paul Nash
 The Mule Track
 Sunrise, Inverness Copse
 We are Making a New World
 Void
 The Ypres Salient at Night
 William Orpen
 Armistice Night, Amiens
 Dead Germans in a Trench
 The Mad Woman of Douai
 Marshal Foch
 Zonnebeke
 Willard Dryden Paddock – Sundial, Boy With Spider
 Glyn Philpot
 Italian Soldier (No. 2)
 Sir James Murray
 Admiral Viscount Jellicoe
 Vice-Admiral Sir Roger Keyes
 Admiral Sir F. C. D. Sturdee
 Rear-Admiral Sir Reginald Tyrwhitt
 Pierre-Auguste Renoir
 Portrait of Adele Besson
 The Bathers
 William Roberts
 The First German Gas Attack at Ypres
 A Shell Dump, France
 Solomon Joseph Solomon – Nina Salaman
 William Strang – Lady with a Red Hat
 Henry Tonks – An Advanced Dressing Station in France
 Viktor Vasnetsov – Frog Princess
 Edward Wolfe – Still Life with Omega Cat
 Francis Derwent Wood – Canada's Golgotha (bronze)
 William Lionel Wyllie – Battle of the Falkland Islands, 1914

Births
 6 February – Lothar-Günther Buchheim, German author, painter and art collector (d. 2007).
 7 February – Markey Robinson, Irish painter (d. 1999).
 12 March – Elaine de Kooning, American abstract expressionist painter (d. 1989).
 22 March – Harry Devlin, American painter and illustrator (d. 2001).
 10 April – Cornell Capa, Hungarian-American photographer and photo curator (d. 2008).
 9 May – Kyffin Williams, Welsh landscape painter (d. 2006).
 10 May – Desmond MacNamara, Irish painter, sculptor and author (d. 2008).
 2 July – Fumiko Hori, Japanese Nihonga painter (d. 2019).
 11 July – Roy Krenkel, American illustrator (d. 1983).
 21 July – David Piper, English curator and novelist (d. 1990).
 25 July – Jane Frank, American painter, sculptor, mixed media and textile artist (d. 1986).
 8 August – Brian Stonehouse, English painter, Special Operations Executive agent during World War II (d. 1998).
 22 September – Cleve Gray, American abstract expressionist painter (d. 2004).
 7 October – Mimmo Rotella, Italian décollage artist and poet (d. 2006).
 8 November – Hermann Zapf, German typeface designer (d. 2015).
 20 November – Corita Kent, American nun and silkscreen printer (d. 1986).
 14 December – Jack Cole, American comic book artist (d. 1958).
 18 December – Kali, born Hanna Gordziałkowska, Polish-born portrait painter, Resistance agent during World War II (d. 1998).

Deaths
 January 7 – Rista Vukanović, Serbian Impressionist painter and husband of painter Beta Vukanović (b. 1873)
 February 6 – Gustav Klimt, Austrian Symbolist painter (b. 1862)
 April 9 – Niko Pirosmani, Georgian painter (b. 1862)
 April 1 – Isaac Rosenberg, English painter and poet (b. 1890)
 April 23 – Paul Sébillot, Breton painter and author (b. 1842)
 May 19 – Ferdinand Hodler, Swiss painter (b. 1853)
 June 28 – Albert Henry Munsell, American inventor of the Munsell color system (b. 1858)
 October 9 – Raymond Duchamp-Villon, French sculptor (b. 1876)
 October 30 – Egon Schiele, Austrian painter (b. 1890)
 November 20 – John Bauer, Swedish illustrator (in shipwreck) (b. 1882)
 December 22 – Charles Edward Perugini, English painter (b. 1839)
 December 23 – Thérèse Schwartze, Dutch portrait painter (b. 1851)

References

 
Years of the 20th century in art
1910s in art